= Arsefoot =

Arsefoot is a common name historically applied to several species of diving birds with their legs placed far back on their bodies, including:

- Great crested grebe (Podiceps cristatus)
- Little grebe (Tachybaptus ruficollis)
- Common loon (Gavia immer)
